Dahui Zonggao (1089–10 August 1163) (Wade–Giles: Ta-hui Tsung-kao; Japanese: Daie Sōkō; Vietnamese: Đại Huệ Tông Cảo) was a 12th-century Chinese Chan (Zen) master. Dahui was a student of Yuanwu Keqin (Wade–Giles: Yuan-wu K'o-ch'in; Japanese: Engo Kokugon) (1063–1135) and was the 12th generation of the Linji school of Chan Buddhism. He was the dominant figure of the Linji school during the Song dynasty.

Dahui introduced the practice of kan huatou, or "inspecting the critical phrase," of a kōan story. This method was called the "Chan of gongan (kōan) introspection" (Kanhua Chan).

Dahui was a vigorous critic of what he called the "heretical Chan of silent illumination" (mozhao xie Chan) of the Caodong school (Wade–Giles: Ts'ao-tung; Japanese: Sōtō).

Biography

Early years
Dahui was born in Xuancheng, Anhui, to the Xi family. He left home at sixteen and became a Buddhist monk at seventeen. His initiatory name was Zong Gao. Following the tradition of the day, he wandered from Chan community to community, seeking instruction. He studied under a Caodong master and mastered the essentials of the Five Ranks in two years. He studied all the records of the Five Houses of Chan, being particularly drawn to the words of Yunmen Wenyan (Wade–Giles: Yün-men Wên-yen Japanese: Ummon Bun’en), 864-949, founder of one of the "Five Houses" of Chan. He sought out instruction on the sayings of the old masters collected and commented on by Xuedou Chongxian (Wade–Giles: Hsüeh-tou Ch’ung-hsien; Japanese: Setchō Jūken) which became the basis for the koan collection, the Blue Cliff Record.

Tangzhou
Dissatisfied with intellectual study, at the age of twenty-one he went to Treasure Peak, near the modern city of Nanchang in Jiangxi Province, to study with Zhan Tangzhun (Wade–Giles: Chan-t'ang Wen-chun), a master of the Huang-lung branch of the Linji School. Although Dahui developed a great intellectual understanding of Chan, enlightenment eluded him. Recognizing his potential and great intellectual abilities, Zhan Tangzhun made Dahui his personal attendant. One day Tangzhou asked Dahui, 
"Why are your nostrils boundless today?" 
Dahui replied, "(Because) I’m at your place." 
Tangzhou retorted, "You phony Chan man."

Another time, when Dahui was twenty-six, Tangzhou called him over and said,

Yuanwu
Dahui continued his studies with Yuanwu Keqin. On his way to Tianning Wanshou, a monastery in the old imperial city of Bian (modern Kaifeng), Dahui vowed to work with Yuanwu for nine years and if he did not achieve enlightenment, or, if Yuanwu turned out to be a false teacher, giving approval too easily, Dahui would give up and turn to writing scriptures or treatises.

Yuanwu gave Dahui Yunmen’s saying, "East Mountain walks on the water" as a koan to work through. Dahui threw himself into the koan and struggled with it day and night, giving forty-nine answers to the koan, but all were rejected by his teacher. Finally, on May 13, 1125, he broke through. Later, he recalled the event:

As it turned out, Yuanwu did not give approval too easily. He said, 

Yuanwu gave Dahui the koan, "To be and not to be --- it is like a wisteria leaning on a tree" to work on and after six months, Dahui achieved the final breakthrough and was recognized by Yuanwu as a Dharma-heir in the Linji tradition.

Teaching career
Yuanwu assigned teaching duties to Dahui and Dahui’s fame spread far and wide. A high ranking government official, the Minister of the Right, Lu Shun, gave Dahui a purple robe and the honorific, "Fori", the Sun of the Dharma. The following year, 1126, the Jürchen Jin dynasty captured the Emperors Huizong and Qinzong; the capital was moved to the south and the Southern Song era began.

Dahui also moved south and taught both monks and laymen. It was at this time that he began his severe criticism of the "heretical Chan of silent illumination" of the Caodong school which he would continue for the rest of his life. He became a great favorite of the educated and literate classes as well as Chan monks and in 1137, at the age of forty-nine, Chancellor Zhang Jun, a student of Dahui, appointed him abbot of Jingshan monastery in the new capital Lin-an (modern Hangzhou, Zhejiang). Within a few years his sangha grew to two thousand and among his lay followers were many high-ranking officials. Dahui became the acknowledged leader of Buddhism of the Southern Song dynasty.

Exile and return

However, disaster was about to befall him. Because of his association with a high official who fell out of favor with the prime minister, all Dahui’s imperial honors and his ordination certificate were stripped from him and he was sent in exile to Hengzhou (Hunan) in the year 1141. At the age of sixty-two he was transferred to present day Guangdong, a place notorious in those days for plagues and hostile elements. Some fifty of Dahui’s monks died there in a plague. Throughout these difficult years, Dahui continued teaching in the Linji tradition of Chan Buddhism, attracting both gentry and commoners. Finally, in 1155, Dahui was pardoned and was allowed to return to his former monastery at Jingshan where he continued his teaching until he died five years later on 10 August 1163. He wrote a final verse for his disciples, saying, "Without a verse, I couldn’t die."
Birth is thus
Death is thus
Verse or no verse
What’s the fuss?

Emperor Xiaozong of Song bestowed upon him the posthumous title "Chan Master of Great Wisdom," from which the name Dahui derives.

Teachings
The enlightenment experience as the answer to the riddle of life and death, and the great doubt necessary to have the determination to break through, became central to Dahui’s teaching.

Kanhua chan
Dahui’s letters to lay people reveal a compassionate teacher, who believed that the enlightenment promised by the Buddha was available to all people, regardless of their daily activities. The best way to achieve this was through the use of gong-ans as a daily meditation device.

Gong-ans

Gong-ans developed during the Tang Dynasty (618-907) from the recorded sayings collections of Chán-masters, which quoted many stories of "a famous past Chán figure's encounter with disciples or other interlocutors and then offering his own comment on it". Those stories and the accompanying comments were used to educate students, and broaden their insight into the Buddhist teachings.

Those stories came to be known as gongan, "public cases". Such a story was only considered a gongan when it was commented upon by another Chán-master. This practice of commenting on the words and deeds of past masters confirmed the master's position as awakened master in a lineage of awakened masters of the past.

Dahui saw this practice of commenting on gongans in his time as becoming a superficial literary study. In a radical move to counter this literary emphasis, he even ordered the suppression of his own teacher’s masterly collection of koans, The Blue Cliff Record (Wade–Giles: Pi Yen Lu; Pinyin: Bìyán Lù; Japanese: Hekiganroku), burning all copies and the wooden blocks to print them, effectively taking the venerated text out of circulation for the next two centuries.

Hua tou practice

Dahui introduced the use of k'an-hua, the concentration on the hua tou ("word head") of a gong-an to attain insight. Until his time, the developing gongan-tradition consisted mainly of commenting on "old cases", adding comments and poetry. This use of written comments and poetry shows the influence of Chinese literati culture, to which both state officials and most Buddhist higher clergy belonged.

Although there were hundreds of koans available, Dahui used only a few, believing that deep penetration of one or two koans would be enough to attain enlightenment. To achieve this, one had to work assiduously and with great determination, like someone whose "head is on fire". It mattered little to Dahui whether a person was particularly intelligent or not – liberation was available to all. He wrote: 

Dahui often used the famous mu-koan, "A monk asked Zhàozhōu, ‘Does a dog have Buddha-nature?’ Zhàozhōu replied, ‘No’ (Chinese: Wu; Japanese: Mu) (which later became the 18th koan in the collection The Book of Equanimity published 61 years after his death in 1224 and then appearing again as the first koan in The Gateless Gate published 4 years later in 1228). Dahui taught that

Doubt
The concept of ‘doubt’ was very important in Dahui’s teaching. He warned his students that they must ‘doubt’ words to not be fooled by them. Furthermore, they needed to ‘doubt’ their very existence. He said,

Influence on the Rinzai-tradition
His teachings on kanhua practice became the standard for the Linji school tradition of koan practice in China, Korea and Japan. Dahui extorted a strong influence on the Japanese Rinzai teacher Hakuin Ekaku, who also taught great doubt as necessary to awaken.

Rejection of silent illumination

Dahui’s teachings contain relentless attacks on the practice of silent illumination, sitting in meditation in tranquility and quietness. He labeled teachers of this type of meditation practice as "heretical" and complained, 

To his opinion this type of practice leads to drowsiness, blankness and intellectualization and conceptualization of Chan Buddhism rather than enlightenment. He thought that teachers who taught this method of meditation had "never awakened themselves, they don’t believe anyone has awakened." For Dahui, koans were the only way to enlightenment and without koans, one would "be like a blind man without a walking stick: unable to take even one step." But koans had to be penetrated fully, not intellectualized. It was this fear of superficiality and intellectualization of old koans that led him to destroy all copies of his own teacher’s masterpiece, the Blue Cliff Record, to save Chan and to authenticate proper koan practice.

Writings
Only one work can be attributed to Dahui, a collection of koans entitled Zhengfa Yanzang 正法眼藏 (The Storehouse of the True Dharma Eye, J. Shobogenzo)

Dahui also compiled the Chánlín Bǎo Xùn (禪林寶訓, "Treasured Teachings of the Chan Monastic Tradition"), instructions of former Chan abbots about the virtues and ideals of monastic life, in collaboration with another monk, Dagui. A disciple of Dahui, Zuyong, compiled a collection of Dahui’s life and teaching called Dahui Bujue Chanshi Nianbu ("Chronological Biography of Chan Master Dahui"). The Zhiyue lu, compiled by Qu Ruji, also contains information on Dahui’s teachings and is the basis of the J. C. Cleary translation Swampland Flowers, of which the majority is a collection of letters Dahui wrote to his students.

See also 
 Index of Buddhism-related articles
 Schools of Buddhism

Notes

References

Sources

 
 Cleary, J.C., 1997 (2006), Swampland Flowers: the letters and lectures of Zen master Ta Hui, Shambhala, 
 
 Cleary, T. & Cleary, J.C., 1994, Zen Letters: teachings of Yuanwu, Shambhala, 
 Dumoulin, Heinrich (1994, 1998) Zen Buddhism: A History, Volume I, India and China, Simon & Schuster and Prentice Hall International 
 Ferguson, Andy (2000) Zen’s Chinese Heritage: the masters and their teachings, Wisdom Publications, 
 Foster, Nelson & Shoemaker, Jack (eds), 1996, The Roaring Stream: a new Zen reader, The Ecco Press, Hopewell, 
 Heine, Steven & Wright, Dale S., 2000, The Koan: texts and contexts in Zen Buddhism, Oxford University Press, 
 
 Levering, Miriam A Monk's Literary Education: Dahui's Friendship with Juefan Huihong; Chung-Hwa Buddhist Journal, No.13.2 (May 2000) pp. 369–384
 
 
 Watson, Burton, 1993, The Zen Teachings of Master Lin-Chi, Shambhala, 
 Yu, Chun-Fang, 1979, Ta-hui Tsung-kao and Kung-an Ch'an, Journal of Chinese Philosophy, v. 6, p. 211-235

External links
 Sacred Library

1089 births
1163 deaths
Chan Buddhists
Rinzai Buddhists
Chinese Zen Buddhists
Song dynasty Buddhist monks
Recipients of Chinese royal pardons
People from Xuancheng